Åkrene is a village in the municipality of Fet, Norway, located between Lillestrøm and Fetsund. Its population (2005) is 259.

References

Villages in Akershus